Çaloire is a commune in the Loire department in central France.

It is close to the villages of Unieux, Chambles and Saint-Paul-en-Cornillon, and 5 km northwest of Firminy, the largest town in the area.

Population

See also
Communes of the Loire department

References

External links
 Çaloire website
 Saint-Étienne Metro website

Caloire